From a Scream to a Whisper was a compilation album consisting of material taken from all of Lowlife's previously released singles, EPs and albums.  No new or previously unavailable songs appeared on the album.

Track listing
"Ramafied"
"Sometime: Something"
"Cowards Way"
"Big Uncle Ugliness"
"Wild Swan"
"Hollow Gut"
"Again and Again"
"A Sullen Sky"
"As It Happens"
"Eternity Road"
"Swing"
"From Side to Side"

All tracks were written by Will Heggie/Craig Lorentson/Stuart Everest/Grant McDowall

Personnel
Lowlife 
Craig Lorentson - vocals
Stuart Everest - guitar
Will Heggie - bass guitar
Grant McDowall - drums

References 

Lowlife (band) albums
1990 compilation albums